Washington's 2nd legislative district is one of forty-nine districts in Washington state for representation in the state legislature. The district runs mostly east-west along the southern extreme of Pierce County but also includes part of Thurston County, including Yelm and Lacey.  

The largely rural district is represented by state senator Jim McCune and state representatives Andrew Barkis (position 1) and J. T. Wilcox (position 2), all Republicans.

List of Washington House of Representatives

Position 1

Position 2

See also
Washington Redistricting Commission
Washington State Legislature
Washington State Senate
Washington House of Representatives
Washington (state) legislative districts

References

External links
Washington State Redistricting Commission
Washington House of Representatives
Map of Legislative Districts

02
Pierce County, Washington
Thurston County, Washington